Sindija Bukša (born 14 December 1997) is a Latvian sprinter. She represented her country at the 2017 World Championships without advancing from the first round. She won a gold medal at the European U23 Championships.

International competitions

1Did not start in the semifinals

Personal bests

Outdoor
100 metres – 11.29 LR (+1.1 m/s, Rīga 2018)
200 metres – 23.02 U23 LR (+1.3 m/s, Rīga 2018)

Indoor
60 metres – 7.43 (Kuldiga 2018)
200 metres – 23.92 (Kuldiga 2018)

References

1997 births
Living people
Latvian female sprinters
World Athletics Championships athletes for Latvia
European Games competitors for Latvia
Athletes (track and field) at the 2019 European Games